The State Literary Award is a set of annual literary prizes by the Government of Sri Lanka under several categories. The awards cover fiction, poetry, translations, songs and cover designs. Works from Sinhala, Tamil and English language are reviewed.

Winners

Self-authored Novels

References

Sri Lankan literary awards